The Beard and Chuang model is a well known and leading theoretical force balance model used to derive the rotational cross-sections of raindrops in their equilibrium state by employing Chebyshev polynomials in series.  

The radius-vector of the raindrop's surface  in vertical angular direction  is equal to

,

where shape coefficients  are defined for the raindrops with different equivolumetric diameter as in following table

Applications 

The description of raindrop shape has some rather practical uses.  Understanding rain is particularly important with regard to the propagation of electromagnetic signals.  A portion of atmosphere that has rain in it, or a rain cell, has the characteristic of attenuating and de-polarizing EM signals that pass through it.  The attenuation of such a signal is approximately proportional to the square of the frequency of the signal, and the de-polarization is proportional to the shape distribution of raindrops in the rain cell.

References 

 K. V. Beard and C. Chuang. A new model for the equilibrium shape of raindrops. Journal of the Atmospheric Sciences, 44:1509-1524, 1987.

Precipitation